Events from the year 2018 in Poland.

Incumbents

 President – Andrzej Duda (independent, supported by Law and Justice)
 Prime Minister – Mateusz Morawiecki (Law and Justice)
 Marshal of the Sejm – Marek Kuchciński (Law and Justice)
 Marshal of the Senate – Stanisław Karczewski (Law and Justice)

Events

January
 28 January - both chambers of the Polish parliament (Sejm and Senate) adopted an Amendment to the Act on the Institute of National Remembrance criminalizing the attribution of Nazi war crimes and condemning use of the expression "Polish death camp" (see "Polish death camp" controversy).

March
 11 March - A new Polish law banning almost all trade on Sundays has taken effect, with large supermarkets and most other retailers closed for the first time since liberal shopping laws were introduced in the 1990s. The Law and Justice party, whose lawmakers passed the legislation with the support of Prime Minister Mateusz Morawiecki.

May
 28 May – Kremlin warns that United States put military pressure in European Union security at risk. Dmitry Peskov said in statement, “When we see the gradual expansion of NATO military structures towards our borders..., this of course in no way creates security and stability on the continent".

November
 25 November – Roksana Węgiel wins the Junior Eurovision Song Contest 2018 for Poland.

Predicted and scheduled events
 The U.S. missile defense complex in Poland is expected to be operational.

Deaths

References

 
2010s in Poland
Years of the 21st century in Poland
Poland
Poland